Robert Morin (born 1949) is a Canadian film director, screenwriter, and cinematographer.

Robert Morin may also refer to:

 Robert Morin (librarian) (1938-2015), a librarian at the University of New Hampshire's Dimond Library
 Robert E. Morin, the chief judge of the Superior Court of the District of Columbia 1996–2016